Asperuginoides is a genus of flowering plants belonging to the family Brassicaceae.

Its native range is Southern Transcaucasus to Western Himalaya.

Species:

Asperuginoides axillaris

References

Brassicaceae
Brassicaceae genera